Michael David Jones (born 15 August 1987) is an English professional footballer who plays as a centre midfielder for Chesterfield.

Jones attended St Anne’s Primary school in Rock Ferry and later St John Plessington Catholic High School.

As a child Jones was an avid Tranmere Rovers fan.

Career

Tranmere Rovers
Jones progressed through the youth ranks at hometown club Tranmere Rovers. He made his debut on 6 May 2006 in a 2–0 loss to Doncaster Rovers at Prenton Park. He made his first appearance of the following season in a 4–2 FA Cup win against Conference team Woking. On 8 January 2007, Jones signed on loan for League Two team Shrewsbury Town on an initial one-month deal. He made his debut on 13 January and scored as Shrewsbury drew 1–1 away to Lincoln City. The loan deal was extended and he went on to make 14 appearances for Shrewsbury before returning to Tranmere at the end of the season. He made his first appearance of the 2007–08 season in a 1–0 home loss to Morecambe in the Football League Trophy on 4 September 2007. He scored his first goal for Tranmere in what was his final game for the club, in a 3–1 loss against Oldham at Boundary Park on 8 March 2008. He was released by Tranmere at the end of the season.

Bury
On 30 July 2008 it was announced that Jones would sign for League Two side Bury. He made his debut in a 1–0 win against Brentford at Gigg Lane on 9 August 2008. He scored his first goal for Bury on 18 October 2008 in a 3–1 away win against Dagenham & Redbridge. His second goal came the following month as Bury beat Lancashire rivals Accrington Stanley 2–1 at the Crown Ground. He scored his first goal of 2009 in a 1–0 home win against Barnet on 10 January. His final goal of the season came in a 2–1 win against Rochdale on 7 March. Bury reached the play-offs and were drawn against his former club Shrewsbury in the semi-finals. The tie went to penalties after Bury had won the first leg 1–0, but lost the second leg 1–0 at home. Jones scored his penalty but Bury lost the shoot-out 4–3. He finished the season with 52 appearances and 4 goals.

He scored his first goal of the 2009–10 season against Hereford United in a 3–1 win at Edgar Street. On 3 October he scored in a 1–1 draw against Torquay. He followed this up with a goal in the next game, scoring against former club Tranmere Rovers in a 2–1 win in the Football League Trophy. His next goal came in the next round of the competition, however Bury were eliminated as they lost 3–2 to Accrington, with Jones equalising for Bury to make the score 2–2 at the time. His next goal came against Accrington, this time a 4–2 league win on 28 December. In January 2010, he scored in back-to-back home wins against Bradford City and Hereford United. On 5 April 2010 he was sent off for the first time in his career after receiving a second yellow card in a 3–0 home win against Burton Albion. He ended the season with 7 goals in 45 appearances and helped Bury to a 9th-place finish in the league.

His first goal of the 2010–11 season came against Cheltenham in a 2–0 win at Whaddon Road. He scored in the following game which was a 4–1 win against Morecambe. On 16 October 2010 he scored the winning goal in a 4–3 win against Torquay at Plainmoor. On 30 October he scored a brace as Bury beat Aldershot 3–1. He scored three more goals that season, coming in wins against Burton, Macclesfield and Barnet. Bury were promoted to League One after finishing second in the table. Jones finished the season with 8 goals in 37 appearances.

He began the season well featuring in a 1–1 away draw against Huddersfield Town and a 3–1 League Cup win against Championship side Coventry City. He scored his first goal of the season in a 2–0 win against Wycombe at Adams Park. He scored again the following game in the second round of the League Cup, where Bury lost 4–2 to Championship side Leicester City. He scored his third goal of the season on 19 November in a 4–2 win against Walsall. His final game for Bury was a 2–1 home win against Walsall, on 2 January 2012.

Sheffield Wednesday
On 12 January 2012, Jones signed for Sheffield Wednesday for an undisclosed fee. Sheffield Wednesday had triggered a release clause in his contract and he signed a two-and-a-half-year-deal. He was assigned the squad number 16, and made his debut a day later in a 1–0 loss at home to league leaders Charlton Athletic, starting the game before being substituted by former Bury teammate Ryan Lowe. After promotion to the Football League Championship with Sheffield Wednesday, Jones became out-of-favour and eventually joined Crawley Town on the summer transfer deadline day, after being with Sheffield Wednesday for only just over six months.

Crawley Town
Mike Jones joined Crawley Town for an undisclosed fee on 31 August 2012. He made his debut on 1 September in a 1–0 win against Leyton Orient, and assisted the only goal of the game scored by Nicky Ajose. He scored his first goal for the club on 23 April 2013, scoring in a 1–0 win against Preston North End. Jones turned down the offer of a new contract from Crawley, in favour of joining Oldham Athletic despite being a firm favourite of boss John Gregory.

Carlisle United
On 22 June 2016 Mike Jones joined Carlisle United on a two-year contract. He scored his first goal for Carlisle in an EFL Cup tie against Derby County which Carlisle lost on penalties on 23 August 2016.

He was offered a new contract by Carlisle at the end of the 2018–19 season and signed a one-year extension. Jones left Carlisle in May 2020 at the end of his deal after the league season was brought to an early close due to the coronavirus pandemic.

Barrow
On 20 July 2020 Jones joined Barrow on a two-year contract, leaving upon its expiry in May 2022.

Chesterfield
On 2 August 2022, Jones signed for National League club Chesterfield on a one-year deal having impressed on trial.

Career statistics

Honours
Bury
 League Two runners up: 2010–11

Sheffield Wednesday
 League One runners up: 2011–12

References

External links

Mike Jones profile at the Sheffield Wednesday website.

Living people
1987 births
Sportspeople from Birkenhead
People from Chirk
Sportspeople from Wrexham County Borough
English footballers
Association football wingers
Tranmere Rovers F.C. players
Shrewsbury Town F.C. players
Bury F.C. players
Sheffield Wednesday F.C. players
Crawley Town F.C. players
Oldham Athletic A.F.C. players
Carlisle United F.C. players
Barrow A.F.C. players
Chesterfield F.C. players
English Football League players